Needle in a haystack may refer to:

 "Needle in a Haystack" (House), an episode of the TV series House
 "Needle in a Haystack", an episode of the TV series Mythbusters
 "Needle in a Haystack", a 1964 pop song record by The Velvelettes

See also
 Needle in the Haystack, a 1953 Brazilian comedy film